Sergey Borodinov (born 9 September 1958) is a Soviet sailor. He competed in the Flying Dutchman event at the 1988 Summer Olympics.

References

1958 births
Living people
Soviet male sailors (sport)
Olympic sailors of the Soviet Union
Sailors at the 1988 Summer Olympics – Flying Dutchman
Place of birth missing (living people)